The 2011 FIFA Women's World Cup qualification UEFA play-offs were a series of two-legged ties determining qualification for the 2011 FIFA Women's World Cup. They involved the eight group winners from the first stage of European qualification.

Format

The play-offs consisted of two sections.

The first section was the direct qualification to the 2011 FIFA Women's World Cup finals.  The eight group winners were paired for four two-legged ties – the winner of each tie qualified for the 2011 FIFA Women's World Cup in Germany.

The second section was the repechage qualification to the UEFA-CONCACAF play-off. The four losers from the direct qualifiers were paired for two two-legged ties, with the two winners playing off over two legs for the right to play against the third-placed CONCACAF nation for a place in the 2011 FIFA Women's World Cup.

Qualification and seeding

The eight UEFA qualification group winners qualified for the play-offs. The play-off draw seeding according to results in this qualifying competition and those for UEFA Women's EURO 2009.

Direct qualification
The four winners qualified for the 2011 FIFA Women's World Cup in Germany. The draw was held on 30 August 2010. Ties were held on 11–12 September and 15–16 September.

Matches

France won 3–2 on aggregate and qualified for the 2011 FIFA Women's World Cup. Italy advanced to the repechage qualification.

England won 5–2 on aggregate and qualified for the 2011 FIFA Women's World Cup. Switzerland advanced to the repechage qualification.

Norway won 3–0 on aggregate and qualified for the 2011 FIFA Women's World Cup. Ukraine advanced to the repechage qualification.

Sweden  won 4–3 on aggregate and qualified for the 2011 FIFA Women's World Cup. Denmark advanced to the repechage qualification.

Repechage qualification
The four losing teams from the qualification play-offs played-off for the right to play against the third-placed CONCACAF nation for a place in the World Cup finals.

The first round of repechage ties was played on 2 and 6 October and the second round on 23 and 27 October.

Knock-out map

Repechage I

Switzerland won 3–1 on aggregate and advanced to the second round of repechage qualification.

Italy won 3–0 on aggregate and advanced to the second round of repechage qualification.

Repechage II

Italy won 5–2 on aggregate and advanced to the UEFA-CONCACAF play-off.

References

External links
 Regulations of the European Qualifying Competition for the 6th FIFA Women's World Cup
 UEFA Women's coefficient ranking – play-off matches for the FIFA WWC

Play-offs
2010 in women's association football
playoff
2010 in Swedish women's football
Qual
2010 in Norwegian women's football
play
Play
2010–11 in Italian women's football
2010–11 in Swiss football
2010–11 in Ukrainian football
2010–11 in Danish women's football